August Wilhelm, Duke of Brunswick-Bevern (10 October 1715 in Braunschweig2 August 1781 in Stettin), Prussian soldier, son of Ernest Ferdinand, Duke of Brunswick-Lüneburg, was born in Braunschweig in 1715, and entered the Prussian army in 1731, becoming colonel of an infantry regiment in 1739. He won great distinction at the battle of Hohenfriedberg as a major-general, and was promoted lieutenant-general in 1750.

Biography
Bevern was one of the most experienced and exact soldiers in the army of Frederick the Great. He commanded a wing in the battle of Lobositz in 1756, and defeated the Austrians under Marshal Königsegg in a well-fought battle at Reichenberg on 21 April 1757. He took part in the battles of Prague and Kolin and the retreat to Görlitz, and subsequently commanded the Prussians left behind by Frederick in the autumn of 1757 when he marched against the French.

Bevern conducted a defensive campaign against overwhelming numbers with great skill, but he soon lost the valuable assistance of General Winterfeldt, who was killed in a skirmish at Moys; and he was eventually brought to battle and suffered a heavy defeat at the battle of Breslau on 22 November. He fell into the hands of the Austrians on the following morning, and remained prisoner for a year. He was made general of infantry in 1759, and on 11 August 1762 inflicted a severe defeat at Reichenbach on an Austrian army endeavouring to relieve Schweidnitz. Bevern retired, after the peace of Hubertusburg, to his government of Stettin, where he died in peace in 1781.

Ancestors

References

1715 births
1781 deaths
Military personnel from Braunschweig
House of Brunswick-Bevern
Generals of Infantry (Prussia)
Prussian military personnel of the Seven Years' War
People of the Silesian Wars
Burials at Brunswick Cathedral